Rapley Holmes (June 1, 1868 – January 11, 1928) was a  stage and screen actor. He was born in Canada and married actress Gerda Holmes.

Holmes played the part of Joe Horn in the long running Somerset Maugham play Rain (1922) starring Jeanne Eagels. On stage he appeared with many greats of the Edwardian era including Maxine Elliott, Elsie Ferguson, Nance O'Neil, Doug Fairbanks and both William and Dustin Farnum.

Holmes began appearing in silent films in 1914 while still maintaining an active role in Broadway plays. His last film role was in 1920, two years before the huge hit of Rain. Acting in Rain dominated the rest of Holmes's career up until his death in January 1928. His role in Rain was played by James A. Marcus in the 1928 Gloria Swanson hit re-titled Sadie Thompson and by Guy Kibbee in the 1932 talkie Rain with Joan Crawford.

Selected filmographyOne Wonderful Night (1914)The Verdict (1914), a shortThrough Eyes of Love (1914), a shortThe Fable of the People's Choice Who Answered the Call of Duty and Took Seltzer (1914)*shortWithin Three Hundred Pages (1914)*shortThe Servant Question (1914), a shortThe Means and the End (1914), a shortThe Buffer (1914), a shortThe Place, the Time and the Man (1914)*shortThe Fable of the Bush League Lover Who Failed to Qualify (1914), a shortThe Battle of Love (1914)The Fable of the City Grafter and the Unprotected Rubes (1915), a shortThe Fable of Hifaluting Tillie and Her Plain Parents (1915), a shortThe Fable of the Syndicate Lover (1915)*shortThe Creed of the Clan (1915), a shortThe Fable of Elvira and Farina and the Meal Ticket (1915)*shortThe Fable of the Cold Gray Dawn of the Morning After (1915)*shortThe Victory of Virtue (1915)Gloria's Romance (1916)Nothing But Lies (1920)The Servant Question'' (1920)

References

External links

 Rapley Holmes at IMDb.com
 Rapley Holmes at IBDb.com

1867 births
1928 deaths
Male actors from Ontario
Canadian male stage actors
Canadian male film actors